A Fibonacci prime is a Fibonacci number that is prime, a type of integer sequence prime.

The first Fibonacci primes are :

2, 3, 5, 13, 89, 233, 1597, 28657, 514229, 433494437, 2971215073, ....

Known Fibonacci primes

It is not known whether there are infinitely many Fibonacci primes.
n = 3, 4, 5, 7, 11, 13, 17, 23, 29, 43, 47, 83, 131, 137, 359, 431, 433, 449, 509, 569, 571, 2971, 4723, 5387, 9311, 9677, 14431, 25561, 30757, 35999, 37511, 50833, 81839, 104911, 130021, 148091.
(Note that the actual values Fn rapidly become very large, so, for practicality, only the indices are listed.)

In addition to these proven Fibonacci primes, several probable primes have been found:
n = 201107, 397379, 433781, 590041, 593689, 604711, 931517, 1049897, 1285607, 1636007, 1803059, 1968721, 2904353, 3244369, 3340367, 4740217, 6530879.

Except for the case n = 4, all Fibonacci primes have a prime index, because if a divides b, then  also divides  (but not every prime index results in a Fibonacci prime). That is to say, the Fibonacci sequence is a divisibility sequence.

Fp is prime for 8 of the first 10 primes p; the exceptions are F2 = 1 and F19 = 4181 = 37 × 113. However, Fibonacci primes appear to become rarer as the index increases. Fp is prime for only 26 of the 1,229 primes p below 10,000. The number of prime factors in the Fibonacci numbers with prime index are:
0, 1, 1, 1, 1, 1, 1, 2, 1, 1, 2, 3, 2, 1, 1, 2, 2, 2, 3, 2, 2, 2, 1, 2, 4, 2, 3, 2, 2, 2, 2, 1, 1, 3, 4, 2, 4, 4, 2, 2, 3, 3, 2, 2, 4, 2, 4, 4, 2, 5, 3, 4, 3, 2, 3, 3, 4, 2, 2, 3, 4, 2, 4, 4, 4, 3, 2, 3, 5, 4, 2, 1, ... 

, the largest known certain Fibonacci prime is F148091, with 30949 digits. It was proved prime by Laurent Facq et al. in September 2021. The largest known probable Fibonacci prime is F6530879. It was found by Ryan Propper in August 2022.
It was proved by Nick MacKinnon that the only Fibonacci numbers that are also twin primes are 3, 5, and 13.

Divisibility of Fibonacci numbers
A prime  divides  if and only if p is congruent to ±1 modulo 5, and p divides  if and only if it is congruent to ±2 modulo 5. (For p = 5, F5 = 5 so 5 divides F5)

Fibonacci numbers that have a prime index p do not share any common divisors greater than 1 with the preceding Fibonacci numbers, due to the identity:

For , Fn divides Fm if and only if n divides m.

If we suppose that m is a prime number p, and n is less than p, then it is clear that Fp cannot share any common divisors with the preceding Fibonacci numbers.

This means that Fp will always have characteristic factors or be a prime characteristic factor itself. The number of distinct prime factors of each Fibonacci number can be put into simple terms.

 Fnk is a multiple of Fk for all values of n and k such that n ≥ 1 and k ≥ 1. It's safe to say that Fnk will have "at least" the same number of distinct prime factors as Fk. All Fp will have no factors of Fk, but "at least" one new characteristic prime from Carmichael's theorem.

 Carmichael's Theorem applies to all Fibonacci numbers except four special cases:  and  If we look at the prime factors of a Fibonacci number, there will be at least one of them that has never before appeared as a factor in any earlier Fibonacci number. Let πn be the number of distinct prime factors of Fn. 
If k | n then  except for 
If k = 1, and n is an odd prime, then 1 | p and 

The first step in finding the characteristic quotient of any Fn is to divide out the prime factors of all earlier Fibonacci numbers Fk for which k | n.

The exact quotients left over are prime factors that have not yet appeared.

If p and q are both primes, then all factors of Fpq are characteristic, except for those of Fp and Fq.

Therefore:

The number of distinct prime factors of the Fibonacci numbers with a prime index is directly relevant to the counting function.

Rank of apparition

For a prime p, the smallest index u > 0 such that Fu is divisible by p is called the rank of apparition (sometimes called Fibonacci entry point) of p and denoted a(p). The rank of apparition a(p) is defined for every prime p. The rank of apparition divides the Pisano period π(p) and allows to determine all Fibonacci numbers divisible by p.

For the divisibility of Fibonacci numbers by powers of a prime,  and 

In particular

Wall–Sun–Sun primes 

A prime p ≠ 2, 5 is called a Fibonacci–Wieferich prime or a Wall–Sun–Sun prime if  where 

It is known that for p ≠ 2, 5, a(p) is a divisor of:

For every prime p that is not a Wall–Sun–Sun prime,  as illustrated in the table below:

The existence of Wall–Sun–Sun primes is conjectural.

Fibonacci primitive part
The primitive part of the Fibonacci numbers are
1, 1, 2, 3, 5, 4, 13, 7, 17, 11, 89, 6, 233, 29, 61, 47, 1597, 19, 4181, 41, 421, 199, 28657, 46, 15005, 521, 5777, 281, 514229, 31, 1346269, 2207, 19801, 3571, 141961, 321, 24157817, 9349, 135721, 2161, 165580141, 211, 433494437, 13201, 109441, ... 

The product of the primitive prime factors of the Fibonacci numbers are
1, 1, 2, 3, 5, 1, 13, 7, 17, 11, 89, 1, 233, 29, 61, 47, 1597, 19, 4181, 41, 421, 199, 28657, 23, 3001, 521, 5777, 281, 514229, 31, 1346269, 2207, 19801, 3571, 141961, 107, 24157817, 9349, 135721, 2161, 165580141, 211, 433494437, 13201, 109441, 64079, 2971215073, 1103, 598364773, 15251, ... 

The primitive part has a non-primitive prime factor in some cases. The ratio between the two above sequences is
1, 1, 1, 1, 1, 4, 1, 1, 1, 1, 1, 3, 1, 1, 1, 1, 1, 1, 1, 1, 1, 1, 1, 2, 5, 1, 1, 1, 1, 1, 1, 1, 1, 1, 1, 3, 1, 1, 1, 1, 1, 1, 1, 1, 1, 1, 1, 2, 1, 1, 1, 1, 1, 1, 1, 7, 1, 1, 1, 1, 1, 1, 1, 1, 1, 1, 1, 1, 1, 1, 1, 1, 1, 1, 1, 1, 1, 1, 1, 1, 1, 1, 1, 1, 1, 1, 1, 1, 1, 1, 13, 1, 1, .... 

The natural numbers n for which  has exactly one primitive prime factor are
3, 4, 5, 7, 8, 9, 10, 11, 13, 14, 15, 16, 17, 18, 20, 21, 22, 23, 24, 25, 26, 28, 29, 30, 32, 33, 34, 35, 36, 38, 39, 40, 42, 43, 45, 47, 48, 51, 52, 54, 56, 60, 62, 63, 65, 66, 72, 74, 75, 76, 82, 83, 93, 94, 98, 105, 106, 108, 111, 112, 119, 121, 122, 123, 124, 125, 131, 132, 135, 136, 137, 140, 142, 144, 145, ... 

For a prime p, p is in this sequence if and only if  is a Fibonacci prime, and 2p is in this sequence if and only if  is a Lucas prime (where  is the th Lucas number). Moreover, 2n is in this sequence if and only if  is a Lucas prime.

0, 0, 1, 1, 1, 0, 1, 1, 1, 1, 1, 0, 1, 1, 1, 1, 1, 1, 2, 1, 1, 1, 1, 1, 1, 1, 2, 1, 1, 1, 2, 1, 1, 1, 1, 1, 3, 1, 1, 1, 2, 1, 1, 2, 1, 2, 1, 1, 2, 2, 1, 1, 2, 1, 2, 1, 2, 2, 2, 1, 2, 1, 1, 2, 1, 1, 3, 2, 3, 2, 2, 1, 2, 1, 1, 1, 2, 2, 2, 2, 3, 1, 1, 2, 2, 2, 2, 3, 2, 2, 2, 2, 1, 1, 3, 2, 4, 1, 2, 2, 2, 2, 3, 2, 1, 1, 2, 1, 2, 2, 1, 1, 2, 2, 2, 2, 2, 3, 1, 2, 1, 1, 1, 1, 1, 2, 2, 2, ... 

1, 1, 2, 3, 5, 1, 13, 7, 17, 11, 89, 1, 233, 29, 61, 47, 1597, 19, 37, 41, 421, 199, 28657, 23, 3001, 521, 53, 281, 514229, 31, 557, 2207, 19801, 3571, 141961, 107, 73, 9349, 135721, 2161, 2789, 211, 433494437, 43, 109441, 139, 2971215073, 1103, 97, 101, ... 

See also
 Lucas number

References

External links
 
 R. Knott Fibonacci primes
 Caldwell, Chris. Fibonacci number, Fibonacci prime, and Record Fibonacci primes at the Prime Pages
 Factorization of the first 300 Fibonacci numbers
 Factorization of Fibonacci and Lucas numbers 
 Small parallel Haskell program to find probable Fibonacci primes at haskell.org

Classes of prime numbers
Fibonacci numbers
Unsolved problems in number theory